Anaheim Ballet is a dance company based in Anaheim, California. Their mission is to "enlighten and entertain audiences with classically rooted programming and contemporary presentation."

History
The company was founded in 1985 under the name Coast Ballet Theater. Anaheim Ballet was named the resident ballet company of the city by Anaheim's City Council in 1997.

As of 2012, the company is led by co-directors Lawrence Rosenberg and Sarma Lapenieks Rosenberg.

Performances
Anaheim Ballet stages regular performances in Anaheim, and also performs extensively in Orange County, Los Angeles, and on tour regionally to Nevada and Arizona.

Anaheim Ballet produces a weekly ballet video podcast on their own YouTube channel.

The Anaheim Ballet also presents the Anaheim International Dance Festival with Chapman University, in association with Youth America Grand Prix.

Anaheim Ballet School
Anaheim Ballet offers classes for students ages 3–adults who are interested in pursuing a career in ballet, or merely looking for recreational training. The school stages an annual Spring Concert, and Anaheim Ballet annually performs the holiday ballet The Nutcracker. Students of Anaheim Ballet School have competed in the finals of the Youth America Grand Prix competition since its founding; the competition is the world's largest international student dance competition. Anaheim Ballet's summer student program draws students from Orange County and from abroad.

"STEP-UP!" Community outreach program
In addition to regular performances and classes, Anaheim Ballet also runs an educational outreach program called STEP-UP!, that offers training to beginners as well as advanced students, with special no-cost accommodations made for under-privileged students.

Professional alumni
 Aria Alekzander, Corps de Ballet, Houston Ballet
 Charles Andersen, Corps de Ballet, Royal Danish Ballet
 Alyssa Springer, Soloist, Houston Ballet

See also
 List of ballet companies in the United States
 Glossary of ballet
 Anaheim

References

Additional sources

External links
 Anaheim Ballet website

Culture of Anaheim, California
Ballet companies in the United States
Ballet schools in the United States
Dance in California